Bradley & Craven Ltd was a manufacturing company specializing in brickmaking machinery in Wakefield England. It was founded in 1843 by two young engineers, William Craven and Richard Bradley to manufacture what was then revolutionary machinery for automating clay brick production. Their 1853 patented ‘Stiff-Plastic Brickmaking Machine’ in combination with the Hoffman continuous kiln were responsible for changes in the industry which eventually saw a shift from hand craft to mechanized production. Their machines were manufactured at the Westgate Common Foundry in Wakefield and were sold throughout the United Kingdom as well as many oversees markets such as Australia, South Africa and Germany.

The company also made steam engines, colliery winding gear and exhibited in the 1862 London International Exhibition.

In 1972 Bradley & Craven, amalgamated with a rival Leeds company, Thomas C. Fawcett, forming Craven Fawcett Limited. However the name continued in use with a new private limited company of the same name incorporated on 1 October 1998 and dissolved on 30 July 2002.

External sources

 Falkirk Community Trust, Museum and Archive collection
 Model of brickmaking machine, Market Hall, Accrington
 Grace's Guide entry for Bradley and Craven

References

See also

Brunswick brickworks
Hoffman kiln
Brick
Brickwork
Brickyard
Masonry
Factories

Brick manufacturers
Defunct manufacturing companies of the United Kingdom
1843 establishments in the United Kingdom
Building materials companies of the United Kingdom